Enrique Aubry de Castro Palomino (born 19 June 1982) is a Mexican politician affiliated with the PVEM. He currently serves as Deputy of the LXII Legislature of the Mexican Congress representing Jalisco.

References

1982 births
Living people
People from Mexico City
Ecologist Green Party of Mexico politicians
21st-century Mexican politicians
Deputies of the LXII Legislature of Mexico
Members of the Chamber of Deputies (Mexico) for Jalisco